USS LST-53 was a  in the United States Navy during World War II. She was later sold to South Korean Navy as ROKS Chang Su (LST-811).

Construction and career 
LST-53 was laid down on 24 September 1943 at Dravo Corp., Neville Island, Pennsylvania. Launched on 6 November 1943 and commissioned on 21 December 1943. She was in ferrying service to New Orleans to undergo fitting out from 5 December to 21 December 1943.

Service in the United States 
During World War II, LST-53 was assigned to the Europe-Africa-Middle East theater and later the Asiatic-Pacific theater. She took part in the invasion of Normandy from 6 to 25 June 1944 and the invasion of Southern France from 15 August to 25 September 1944.

She then participated in the assault and occupation of Okinawa from 17 to 30 June 1945.

LST-53 was decommissioned on 22 January 1946 and was assigned to Commander Naval Forces Far East (COMNAVFE) Shipping Control Authority for Japan (SCAJAP) in which she was designated Q021. She was put into the Reserve Fleet following the end of her service there and later loaned to South Korea.

She was struck from the Navy Register.

Service in South Korea 
ROKS Chang Su was acquired by the South Korean Navy on 11 May 1955 and was commissioned on an unknown date.

She was decommissioned on 18 April 1959 and her fate is unknown.

Awards 
LST-53 have earned the following awards:

American Campaign Medal
Combat Action Ribbon
Europe-Africa-Middle East Campaign Medal (2 battle stars)
Asiatic-Pacific Campaign Medal (1 battle star)
World War II Victory Medal
Navy Occupation Service Medal (with Asia clasp)

Citations

Sources 
 
 
 
 

World War II amphibious warfare vessels of the United States
Ships built in Pennsylvania
1943 ships
LST-1-class tank landing ships of the United States Navy
Ships transferred from the United States Navy to the Republic of Korea Navy